Perseus is a figure in Greek mythology.

Perseus may also refer to:

People 
 Perseus (geometer), ancient Greek mathematician
 Perseus of Macedon, last king of Macedon
 Perseus of Pylos
 Perseus Karlström (born 1990), Swedish racewalker
 Perseus (spy), a Soviet spy at White Sands Missile Range

Fictional people 
 Perseus (Pantheon), a fictional character in Marvel Comics
 Perseus "Percy" Jackson, the main protagonist of the children's book series Percy Jackson & the Olympians by Rick Riordan
 Perseus, a fictional character in the light novel series Campione! and its derived works
 Perseus, a fictional factions in the video game call of duty series Black Ops Cold War
 Perseus, the code name for Dr. Howard Busgang in the TV Series Chuck

Places 
 Mount Perseus, an ice dome on Candlemas Island, South Sandwich Islands
 Mount Perseus (British Columbia), a mountain in Canada
 Perseus Crags, a group of nunataks in Palmer Land, Antarctica
 Perseus Peak, a summit in the Cook Mountains, Antarctica

Astronomy 
 Perseus (constellation), a constellation in the northern sky
 Perseus Arm, an arm of the Milky Way
 Perseus Cluster, a galaxy cluster
 Perseus–Pisces Supercluster, galaxy cluster chain
 Perseus molecular cloud, a giant gas and dust cloud
 Perseids, a prolific meteor shower associated with the comet Swift-Tuttle

Ships 
 HMS Perseus, any of several ships of the Royal Navy
 USNS Perseus (T-AF-64), a 1944 American stores ship
 USS Perseus (WPC-114), a U.S. Coast Guard ship built by Bath Iron Works (1932)
 Perseus (Soviet ship), a Soviet arctic research ship (1922–1941)
 Perseus (1799 ship), an English sailing ship

Mythology 
 Perseus, son of Danae and Zeus
 Perseus (son of Nestor), a son of Nestor and Eurydice (or Anaxibia) who appears in the Odyssey

Other uses 
 Perseus (munition), a 900 kg (2,000 lb) bomb made in Greece
 "Perseus" (song), a song by Hitomi Shimatani
 Perseus Books Group, a publishing company
 Perseus Project, a digital library
 Perseus, a GWR Iron Duke Class steam locomotive
 Bristol Perseus, an aero engine
 CVS401 Perseus, a supersonic cruise missile concept
 Ferranti Perseus, a British vacuum tube (valve) computer
 UGM-89 Perseus, a cancelled project for an American missile
 Hero Perseus, a special unit in the video game Age of Empires
 perseus, the code name of the Xiaomi Mi MIX 3 smartphone

See also 
 Perses (disambiguation)
 Perseus and Andromeda (disambiguation)